Baeolophus is a genus of birds in the family Paridae. Its members are commonly known as titmice. All the species are native to North America. In the past, most authorities retained Baeolophus as a subgenus within the genus Parus, but treatment as a distinct genus, initiated by the American Ornithological Society, is now widely accepted.

Etymology
The genus name Baeolophus translates to small crested and is a compound of the Ancient Greek words  : baiós - small, and  : lόphοs - crest.

Taxonomy
The genus contains the following five species:

References

 
Bird genera

Taxa named by Jean Cabanis
Taxonomy articles created by Polbot